Panaglide is a brand of camera stabilizer mounts for motion picture cameras made by Panavision.

The Panaglide steadies the camera operator's movement, allowing for a smooth shot.

The Panaglide was used in such films as Halloween and Terrence Malick's Days of Heaven, which was the first film to use the Panaglide.

See also
Steadicam

References

American inventions
Cinematography
Film and video technology
Photography equipment
Trademarks